for large military guns see Large-calibre artillery
 for the arcade game equipment see SuperGun
 the Iraq "Supergun affair" (a contemporary of Arms-to-Iraq)